Svetlana Forsova is a Russian writer from Korenovsk, city in Kuban region of Russian Federation. Svetlana Forsova has written few articles and two books dedicated to the history and culture of the Kuban region.

Sources 
 http://syktyvkar.eparchia.ru/nlk70.html

Works 
 Светлана Форсова. "Уроки невыдуманной истории" – "Экоинвест", Краснодар, 2009. 180 с.
 Светлана Форсова. "Страницы истории Кореновского района" – "Принт Терра", Краснодар, 2011. 200 с.

Living people
Year of birth missing (living people)
People from Korenovsky District